Chia Chou (born 1960) is a Taiwanese pianist, and a naturalised Canadian citizen. He settled in Germany in the 1980s.

He had his first public performance at the age of 7. In 1980–81, he won the Mendelssohn Competition in Berlin and the second edition of the Sydney Competition; a wide international concert career ensued. In 1983 he became the first artist with Chinese ancestry living abroad to perform in China since the Cultural Revolution.

Chou is a member of the Parnassus Trio since 1990 and a professor in Chamber Music at the Kunstuniversität Graz since 2004.

References

Taiwanese classical pianists
Canadian classical pianists
1960 births
Living people
Sydney International Piano Competition prize-winners
Canadian musicians of Taiwanese descent
21st-century classical pianists